Finnbogi Hermannsson (born 20 September 1945) is an Icelandic writer, reporter and politician. He was a member of Alþingi for the Progressive Party in 1980. He worked as a reporter for RÚV for several decades.

References

External links
Bio at Alþingi

1945 births
Finnbogi Hermannsson
Finnbogi Hermannsson
Finnbogi Hermannsson
Finnbogi Hermannsson
Living people